The Serie C is the third-highest division in the Italian football league system after the Serie B and Serie A. The Lega Italiana Calcio Professionistico (Lega Pro) is the governing body that runs the Serie C.

The unification of the Lega Pro Prima Divisione and the Lega Pro Seconda Divisione as Lega Pro Divisione Unica (often also abbreviated as Lega Pro) in 2014 reintroduced the format of the original Serie C that existed between 1935 and 1978 (before the split into Serie C1 and Serie C2). On 25 May 2017 the Lega Pro assembly unanimously approved the return to the original name  of the competition to Serie C.

History
A third division above the regional leagues was first created in Italy in 1926, when fascist authorities decided to reform the major championships on a national basis, increasing the number of teams participating by promoting many regional teams from the Third Division (Terza Divisione) to the Second Division (Seconda Divisione).

A new league running this Second Division, the Direttorio Divisioni Inferiori Nord (Northern Directory of Lower Divisions) was set up in Genoa, while football activity in the southern part of the country was run by the Direttorio Divisioni Inferiori Sud which later became the Direttorio Meridionale (Southern Directory). These leagues did not last long; after another reform they were disbanded between 1930 and 1931. Some bigger clubs who owned large pitches with dimensions of 100x60 metres were promoted to the First Division (Prima Divisione); a league defined and structured as the "National Championship".

The Second Division had no relegations to regional leagues as most were reelected at the beginning of each new season. Once a critical threshold was reached the Italian federation decided to close the two leagues and move all teams to the "Direttori Regionali" (Regional Committees) so that the labour-intensive job of organisation was delegated to more efficient and organised regional staff.

The most successful teams coming from the Second Divisions in 5 years (from 1926–27 to 1930–31) composed 6 ever-growing sections of the First Division (Prima Divisione) which at the beginning had just a few teams in just one section from southern Italy.

This championship was organized by the same league governing Serie A and Serie B (the "Direttorio Divisioni Superiori"), even if, as opposed to the two higher divisions, it was structured in local groups with geographical criteria. The number of clubs belonging to the Prima Divisione continued to increase every year, until FIGC decided to rename it Serie C (at the beginning of the 1935–36 season) while a subsequent large reduction in 1948 led to the creation of a sole national division in 1952–53.

The reform that created the actual league was decided by Bruno Zauli in 1959 as he built on the incomplete work started by the former president Ottorino Barassi to make professional football fully recognised and organised. While Lega Calcio had a stated mission of organising professional and national divisions, the new Lega Nazionale Semiprofessionisti based in Florence had to regulate the two semiprofessional and subnational divisions: Serie C and Serie D, with the first one adopting a format of three groups of 20 teams each. In 1978 the semiprofessional sector was abolished; Serie D became an amateur section while Serie C was divided into two professional divisions (Serie C1 and Serie C2), and the league changed its name to Lega Professionisti Serie C. On 20 June 2008, the league was restructured and took its current name Lega Italiana Calcio Professionistico.

After the league reform of 2014, the two previous divisions of Lega Pro Prima Divisione and Lega Pro Seconda Divisione were ultimately merged into a new league; the Lega Pro Divisione Unica or more informally addressed as just Lega Pro. This is the league structure currently in operation; comprising 60 teams that are divided geographically in three groups of 20 each. At the end of each season, four teams are promoted to Serie B (three group winners, plus one coming from a promotion playoff involving the three group runners-up). Meanwhile, nine teams are relegated to Serie D: the last-placed team from each group go down directly, whereas teams between 16th and 19th from each group place play a relegation playoff (officially referred to as play-out), with the two losing teams from each group also relegated.

In May 2017, the Lega Pro assembly unanimously approved the return to the original name Serie C. The 2017–18 Serie C season includes 19 teams in each of the three divisions after adjustments were made for excluded clubs.

Format
Serie C is composed of 60 teams divided equally into three groups split horizontally in geographical terms, from north to south (basically they are three leagues unbound from each other during regular season). The round-robin format is used, with the two halves of the season having exactly the same order of fixtures. Three points are awarded for a win, one for a draw and none for a loss. At the end of the regular season one table per group is determined, based on points. If two or more teams are tied on points, the following tie-breaking criteria apply:
 Head-to-head points; 
 Head-to-head goal difference; 
 Goal difference; 
 Goals scored; 
 Lower goals against; 
 Wins; 
 Lower losses; 
 Away wins; 
 Lower home losses.
A total of 4 teams are promoted to Serie B and 9 teams are relegated to Serie D. The winner team of each group is directly promoted and qualifies for Supercoppa di Serie C. Teams which have finished in the bottom of the league are directly relegated. The other divisional changes are determined through a complex system of promotion and relegation play-offs.

Promotion play-offs
28 teams compete to achieve the only available spot for Serie B. 27 of them are the teams which have finished in the 2nd to 10th positions (9 per group). The 28th team is the winner of Coppa Italia Serie C. There are a total of six rounds:
 First round. Fixtures pair the 5th v 10th, 6th v 9th and 7th v 8th-placed teams;
 Second round. Fixtures pair the 4th v the worst-placed team and the best-placed team v the 2nd best-placed team from the previous round.
First round and Second round consist in single-leg games and, if teams are tied after regular time, the higher-placed team advances. 6 teams (2 per group) advance to the next round.
 Third round. The three 3rd-placed teams, Coppa Italia Serie C winner and the best-placed team from the previous round are seeded. Fixtures are drawn;
 Quarter-finals. The three 2nd-placed teams and the best-placed team from the previous round are seeded. Fixtures are drawn.
Third round and Quarter-finals consist in two-legged games, with seeded team playing at home for second leg, and, if teams are tied on aggregate, the seeded team advances. 
The four winning teams reach the Final four, composed of:
 Semi-finals;
 Final.
Final four fixtures are drawn, all games are two-legged and, if teams are tied on aggregate, the winner is decided by extra-time and a penalty shootout if required. 

In order to determine the best-placed team, the following criteria apply:
 League position;
 Points;
 Wins;
 Goals scored;
 Draw.

If the winner of Coppa Italia Serie C:
 finishes in the top three, qualifies for the relegation play-offs, is relegated directly, or just renounces, its spot goes to the runners-up or, subordinately, if they meet the same requirements, to the 4th-placed team playing in the same group as the winner. Thus, the 5th-placed team advances automatically to the Second round and faces the worst-placed team from the First round, whose fixtures now pair the 6th v 11th, 7th v 10th and 8th v 9th-placed teams;
 finishes in the 4th to 10th positions, the 11th-placed team playing in the same group qualifies for the First round. Fixtures of First round and Second round still respect the order of the seven participating teams as seen before, with the best-placed team (that can be the 4th or 5th-placed team if Coppa Italia Serie C winner finished 4th) entering the Second round and facing the worst-placed team among the other six which play the First round;
 gives its spot to the runners-up and they finish in the 4th to 10th positions, the 11th-placed team playing in the same group as the runners-up qualifies for the First round (for fixtures see the point 2).

Relegation play-outs
Number of teams which play the so called play-out in the Italian football is variable. Usually, fixtures pair the 16th v 19th and 17th vs 18th-placed teams. Matches are two-legged, the higher-placed team plays at home for second leg and, if teams are tied on aggregate, the lower-placed team is relegated to Serie D. However, if the higher-placed team finishes 9 or more points ahead of the lower-placed team, play-out is canceled and team is relegated directly.

Homegrown players
To encourage the development of homegrown players, all Lega Pro clubs were capped to use no more than 16 players in their squads that were older than 23 years of age (in 2019–20 season, player born before 1 January 1997), plus two wildcard for long serving players of the clubs. The clubs could use an unlimited numbers of under-23 players.

Clubs

2022–23 members

Group A (North) 
9 teams from Lombardy, 4 team froms Veneto, 3 teams from  Piedmont, 2 teams from Friuli Venezia Giulia, 1 team from Emilia-Romagna and 1 team from Trentino-South Tyrol.

Group B (Centre) 
6 teams from Tuscany, 5  teams from Emilia-Romagna, 4 teams from Marche, 2 team from Sardinia. 1 team from Liguria, 1 team from Piedmont and 1 team from Umbria.

Group C (South) 
6 teams from Apulia, 5 teams from Campania, 3 teams from Lazio, 2 teams from Basilicata, 2 teams from Calabria, 1 team from Abruzzo and 1 team from Sicily.

Seasons in Serie C
This is the complete list of the clubs that took part in the 38 Serie C seasons played from the 1935–36 season until the 1977–78 season (participation in the editions of the 1945–46, 1946–47 and 1947–48 seasons, championships that due to World War II, are excluded from the list as they were divided into two completely independent leagues), the three Lega Pro seasons played from the 2014–15 season until the 2016–17 season, and from the 2017–18 season. The teams in bold competed in Serie C in the 2021–22 season.

 35 times: Lecce
 33 times: Piacenza
 31 times: Cosenza
 30 times: Prato
 29 times: Cremonese, Empoli, Salernitana, Siracusa, Treviso
 28 times: Biellese, Rimini
 27 times: Ravenna
 26 times: Ancona, Arezzo, Legnano
 25 times: Savona, Siena
 24 times: Mestre, Sambenedettese
 23 times: Mantova, Pistoiese
 22 times: Casertana, Chieti, Crotone, Lecco, Maceratese, Trapani
 21 times: Parma, Reggina
 20 times: Forlì, Grosseto, Lucchese, Pescara, Pro Patria, Sanremese, Taranto
 19 times: Ascoli, Carrarese, Casale, L'Aquila, Livorno, Marzotto, Pisa, Seregno, Spezia, Udinese
 18 times: Foggia, Pro Vercelli, Reggiana
 17 times: Alessandria, Barletta, Entella, Marsala, Potenza
 16 times: Juve Stabia, Messina, Monza, Pavia, Torres, Varese, Venezia, Vigevano
 15 times: Brindisi, Catanzaro, Monfalcone, Perugia, Pontedera
 14 times: Avellino, Benevento, Padova, Savoia
 13 times: Bolzano, Cesena, Como, Gallaratese,  Massese, Matera, Rapallo, SPAL
 12 times: Akragas, Crema, Jesi, Fano, Olbia, Pordenone, Pro Gorizia, Sestrese, Solbiatese, Trento, Triestina, Vis Pesaro
 11 times: Asti, Carbosarda, Catania, Derthona, Fanfulla, Teramo, Ternana
 10 times: Acireale, Carpi, Montevarchi, Omegna, Signa,
 9 times: Baracca Lugo, Cagliari, Molfetta, Ponziana,  Rovigo, Trani, Vastese, Viareggio
 8 times: Bisceglie, Civitavecchia, Falck, Forlimpopoli, Giulianova, Grion Pola, Ilva Bagnolese, Piombino, Sangiovannese, Sorrento
 7 times: Acqui, Audace, Bari, Clodia Sottomarina, Cuneo, Fiumana, Gubbio, Imolese, Imperia, Ivrea, Nocerina, Novara, Saronno, Turris, Verbania
 6 times: Ampelea, Bassano Virtus, Belluno, Caratese, Latina, MATER, Modena, Paganese, Pontedecimo, Ponte San Pietro, Rivarolese, Rovereto, Tevere Roma, Vittorio Veneto, Vicenza, Viterbese
 5 times: Andrea Doria, Cantù, Foligno, Frosinone, Juventus Domo, Palazzolo, Pinerolo, Pro Lissone, Redaelli Rogoredo, Riccione, Rosignano Solvay, San Donà, Schio, Trevigliese, Vado
 4 times: Alba Roma, AlbinoLeffe, Alfa Romeo, Battipagliese, Cavese, Cecina, Città di Castello, Colleferro, Edera Trieste, FeralpiSalò, Fermana, Fossanese, Fucecchio, Giana Erminio, Pro Piacenza, Internapoli, Manfredonia, Martina Franca, Massiminiana, Monsummanese, Nardò, Nissa, Orbetello, Pirelli, Renate, Sant'Angelo, Santarcangelo, Saviglianese, SIAI Marchetti, Südtirol, Suzzara, Toma Maglie
 3 times: Albenga, Aosta, Armando Casalini, Arsenale Venezia, Campobasso, Cerignola, Cirio, Civitanovese, Fidelis Andria, Forte dei Marmi, Gerli, Igea Virtus, Juventus Siderno, Libertas Trieste, Lumezzane, Lupa Roma, Meda, Melfi, Molinella, Monopoli, Mortara, Palmese, Parabiago, Pieris, Rieti, Scafatese, SIME Popoli, Tuttocuoio, Villasanta, Vogherese
 2 times: Agrigento, Ala Littoria, Albese, Amatori Bologna, Breda, Bondenese, Cinzano, Codogno, Dipendenti Municipali La Spezia, Enna, FEDIT, Fondi, Galliate, Ischia Isolaverde, Lanciano, Luino, Magenta, Novese, Panigale, Pergocrema, Pietro Resta, Pro Italia, Racing Roma, Rizzoli, Sora, Sparta Novara, Tivoli, Varazze, Verona, Virtus Francavilla, VV.FF. Palermo, VV.FF. Roma
 1 time: 94º Reparto Reggimento Distrettuale, Abbiategrasso, Alcamo, Andreanelli, Ardens, A.R.S.A., Arzachena, Aullese, Aversa Normanna, Avio Calcio, Avio Squadra, Aviosicula Palermo, Brescia, Budrio, Cantiere Tosi, Caproni, Centese, Centrale del Latte di Genova, Chinotto Neri, Cittadella, Corniglianese, Cossatese, Cynthia, FIAT Torino, Fortitudo Trieste, Gavinovese, Gavorrano, Genoa, Giovinezza, Guastalla, Ilva Savona, Isotta Fraschini, Juve Pomigliano, Juventina Palermo, Lanciotto, Legnago, Luparense, Magazzini Generali, Marzotto Manerbio, Melzo, Mirandolese, Mogliano, Montebelluna, Palermo-Juventina, Pellizzari Arzignano, Pro Enna, Pro San Giorgio, Pro Sesto, Ragusa, Real Vicenza, R.S.T. Littorio, San Marino, Sebinia, Sestri Levante, Settimese, Sicula Leonzio, Tenente Mario Passamonte, Torviscosa, Ventimigliese, Vigor Lamezia, Villafranca, Vincenzo Benini, Virtus Spoleto, Vis Nova, Vittorio Necchi, Vibonese

Champions

For Serie C1 and Lega Pro Prima Divisione winners, see Lega Pro Prima Divisione and for Serie C2 and Lega Pro Seconda Divisione winners, see Lega Pro Seconda Divisione between 1978–79 and 2013–14

Serie C
 1935–36 – Venezia, Cremonese, Spezia, Catanzaro
 1936–37 – Padova, Vigevano, Sanremese, Anconitana, Taranto
 1937–38 – SPAL, Fanfulla Lodi, Casale, Siena, Salernitana
 1938–39 – Brescia, Catania
 1939–40 – Reggiana, Vicenza, Maceratese
 1940–41 – Prato, Fiumana
 1941–42 – Cremonese, Juventina Palermo
 1942–43 – Varese, Pro Gorizia
 1943–45 – no national competition due to World War II
 1945–46 – Mestrina, Prato, Perugia, Alba Ala Roma, Benevento, Lecce, Leone Palermo
 1946–47 – Magenta, Vita Nova P.S. Pietro, Bolzano, Centese, Nocerina
 1947–48 – competed amongst 18 regional leagues, no promotion to Serie B, no overall champions
 1948–49 – Fanfulla Lodi, Udinese, Prato, Avellino
 1949–50 – Seregno, Treviso, Anconitana, Messina
 1950–51 – Monza, Marzotto Valdagno, Piombino, Juve Stabia
 1951–52 – Cagliari
 1952–53 – Pavia
 1953–54 – Parma
 1954–55 – Bari
 1955–56 – Venezia
 1956–57 – Prato
 1957–58 – Reggiana
 1958–59 – OZO Mantova, Catanzaro
 1959–60 – Pro Patria, Prato, Foggia
 1960–61 – Modena, Lucchese, Cosenza

 1961–62 – Triestina, Cagliari, Foggia
 1962–63 – Varese, Prato, Potenza
 1963–64 – Reggiana, Livorno, Trani
 1964–65 – Novara, Pisa, Reggina
 1965–66 – Savona, Arezzo, Salernitana
 1966–67 – Monza, Perugia, Bari
 1967–68 – Como, Cesena, Ternana
 1968–69 – Piacenza, Arezzo, Casertana
 1969–70 – Novara, Massese, Casertana
 1970–71 – Reggiana, Genoa, Sorrento
 1971–72 – Lecco, Ascoli, Brindisi
 1972–73 – Parma, SPAL, Avellino
 1973–74 – Alessandria, Sambenedettese, Pescara
 1974–75 – Piacenza, Modena, Catania
 1975–76 – Monza, Rimini, Lecce
 1976–77 – Cremonese, Pistoiese, Bari
 1977–78 – Udinese, SPAL, Nocerina
Lega Pro
 2014–15 – Novara, Teramo stripped of title due to match fixing, awarded to Ascoli, Salernitana
 2015–16 – Cittadella, SPAL, Benevento
 2016–17 – Cremonese, Venezia, Foggia
Serie C
 2017–18 – Livorno, Padova, Lecce
 2018–19 – Virtus Entella, Pordenone, Juve Stabia
 2019–20 – Monza, Vicenza, Reggina
 2020–21 – Como, Perugia, Ternana
 2021–22 – Südtirol, Modena, Bari

Notes

References

External links

  
 Datasport: results, rankings and news about the Lega Pro (archived)

 
3
1935 establishments in Italy
Italy
Sports leagues established in 1935
Professional sports leagues in Italy